Connétables or constables are the civic heads of the twelve parishes of Jersey and ten parishes of Guernsey. The  is grounded in Norman customary law. The structure, powers and responsibilities of the role differ between the islands, reflecting their different political histories.

Jersey 

 are the heads of the twelve parishes of Jersey.

At parish-level, the constable presides over the Roads Committee, the Conseil Paroissial (except St. Helier) and parish assemblies. The twelve constables also collectively sit as the Comité des Connétables. The constable is the titular head of the Honorary Police. With the Roads Inspectors, Roads Committee and other officers, the constable of each parish also carries out the visites du branchage twice a year.

History 
The office is unique to the island, being no parallel office in England or mainland Normandy, though Victor Hugo believed the office to of English origin, perhaps a version of the English mayor.

Guernsey 
In Guernsey, each parish elects two constables, the senior constable and the junior constable. Persons elected generally serve a year as junior and then senior constable. The senior constable presides over the Douzaine that runs the parish. The constables are responsible for enforcing the decisions of the parish including the branchage (summer hedge-cutting).

Sark

In Sark, the connétable (or constable) is the senior of two police officers and police administrator and the vingtenier is the junior police officer.

See also
Constable

References

Parishes of Jersey
Law enforcement in the Channel Islands
Jersey
Parochial politics of Jersey
Jersey law
Constables of Jersey
Guernsey law